Sean Fenton (born June 4, 1992), better known by the stage name Elijah Blake, is a Dominican-American singer, songwriter and record producer. He wrote songs for Keyshia Cole, Rick Ross, Rihanna, and co-wrote Usher's number-one R&B hit, "Climax".

At age 16, Blake signed with Atlantic Records and worked with Trey Songz on his Ready album in 2009.

In December 2012, Blake released his debut mixtape, Bijoux 22, which included the song "X.O.X", co-written and featuring Common.  In 2014, he released the EP, Drift.

In March 2015, Blake released single "I Just Wanna" that was featured on his album "Shadows & Diamonds". On April 5, 2019, he released his new joint EP “1990 Forever” with pop/RnB singer Jordin Sparks.

Early life 
Blake was born in the Dominican Republic and raised in Florida by a Haitian father and Dominican mother.

Discography
 Bijoux 22 (2012)
 Drift (2014)
 Shadows & Diamonds (2015)
 Blueberry Vapors (2016)
 Audiology (2017)
 Bijoux 23 (2018)
 1990 Forever (2019)
Holiday Love (2019)
The Neon Eon (2021)

Songwriting credits

References

External links
 Eljiah Blake at DefJam

Living people
Dominican Republic emigrants to the United States
American contemporary R&B singers
American male songwriters
American people of Haitian descent
Place of birth missing (living people)
Roc Nation artists
1992 births
21st-century American singers